Elisa María Avelina "Lilita" Carrió (born 26 December 1956) is an Argentine lawyer, professor, and politician. She is the leader of Civic Coalition ARI, one of the founders of Cambiemos, and was National Deputy for Chaco Province and Buenos Aires.

Carrió is considered a liberal, Christian, and heterodox politician in Argentina.

Carrió marked her firm stance against abortion before and after entering Congress, while Mauricio Macri encouraged legislators to maturely and responsibly debate an issue that divided the opposition and the ruling party.

Biography

Born in Resistencia, Chaco, in a traditional family, Carrió was a former teenage beauty queen. Her father, Rolando "Coco" Carrió, was a prominent Radical Civic Union politician. Her mother, María "Lela" Elisa Rodríguez, was a literature professor. She enrolled at the National University of the Northeast and earned a law degree in 1978 and later earned a graduate degree in Public Law at the National University of the Littoral. Carrió entered public service as a technical advisor to the Chaco Province Prosecutor's Office in 1979, and was appointed to the provincial Solicitor General's office in 1980. 
 
She later taught constitutional law at her alma mater, and from 1986 to 1988 served as director of the human rights department of the University of Buenos Aires Law School. In 2004, she founded the Hannah Arendt Institute of Cultural and Political Education (Spanish: Hannah Arendt instituto de formación cultural y política), where she has taught ever since.

Politics
Carrió entered politics at the request of her mentor, Raúl Alfonsín, was elected to the 1994 Constitutional Amendments Convention, during which she was a leading sponsor of Article 75, section 22, which mandated the adoption of international human rights treaties ratified by Argentina into the Argentine Constitution. She was elected to the Chamber of Deputies for her province, representing the centrist Radical Civic Union (UCR), in 1995, and in 1997, obtained passage of a bill giving constitutional authority to the international Treaty of Disappeared Persons.

She campaigned heavily for Fernando de la Rúa in 1999. Re-elected to Congress, Carrió earned growing publicity as the chair of the Congressional Committee on Corruption and Money Laundering after 1999, particularly during a series of exchanged accusations in 2001 between herself and Economy Minister Domingo Cavallo. 
 
After the rupture in 2000 of the Alliance for Work, Justice and Education (which the UCR had formed in 1997 with Socialists and the Front for a Country in Solidarity), Carrió turned to the Democratic Socialist Party and other politicians with leftist leanings who were discontented in their parties, and formed an informal front, initially called "Argentinians for a Republic of Equals" (Argentinos por una República de Iguales), ARI. After dissensions, the socialists left, and so did Carrió and other figures from their original parties. Together, they formed a new party, called Alternative for a Republic of Equals (also Civic Coalition ARI), in 2002.

In the 2003 elections, Carrió ran for president with Mendoza deputy Gustavo Gutiérrez as the candidate for the Civic Coalition ARI party. Prior to running together, she had worked with him in the 2001 Money Laundering Investigation Commission (Spanish: Comisión investigadora de lavado de dinero). They ended up in the fourth place with about 16% of the votes, behind former president Carlos Menem, would-be president Néstor Kirchner, and minister of economy Ricardo López Murphy. After losing the election, she worked on securing the Civic Coalition ARI, which went through a major crisis during the 2003–07 Kirchner presidency, with members unable to settle their differences and several deputies leaving for the National Government. She returned to the Lower House of Congress in 2005, after winning a seat as a National Deputy for the Autonomous City of Buenos Aires with just over 20% of votes.

Carrió ran again for the Presidency on the 2007 elections, representing a front called the Civic Coalition. In March 2007 she resigned her seat in Congress to conduct the campaign. Together with her running mate Rubén Giustiniani (chairman of the Socialist Party), Carrió obtained about 23% of the vote, coming in a distant second after first lady Cristina Fernández de Kirchner. She won a majority in two of the three largest cities of Argentina (Buenos Aires and Rosario), but she suffered a larger defeat in Buenos Aires Province, the most populous district. Ultimately, Carrió lost to Cristina Fernández de Kirchner by a nearly 2-to-1 margin, and came up well short of forcing her into a ballotage. In Argentina, a presidential candidate can win an outright victory by either winning at least 45 percent of the vote, or 40 to 44 percent of the vote while finishing at least 10 points ahead of the runner-up.

Following the 2007 election, Carrió announced she would not be running for the presidency again, declaring that she would instead enhance her role as "leader of the opposition" and seek to become a member of or influence in a future administration following the 2011 elections. She was reunited ahead of the June 2009 mid-term elections with erstwhile allies, the UCR and Socialists, in the Civic and Social Agreement. This coalition yielded gains only for the UCR, however, and Carrió's reduced influence therein ended in her acrimonious departure from the group in August 2010. She later reconsidered her earlier decision to opt out of the 2011 presidential race, and on December 12, 2010, she announced her candidacy on the Civic Coalition/ARI ticket. Carrió received 1.8% of the vote in the 23 October election, placing last in a field of seven candidates.

Carrió joined the Broad Front UNEN alliance upon its formation in June 2013, and was reelected to the Lower House on their ticket in elections that October. Her desire to fold UNEN into a coalition led by the PRO party, led to her break with UNEN in November 2014. The UCR also left the coalition and joined the PRO as well. The three parties became a new coalition, Cambiemos. She run for the presidency in the primary elections, and lost to Mauricio Macri. Macri won the 2015 general elections afterwards.

She voted against the legalization of abortion. After losing in the vote, Elisa Carrió left angry and warned: "Let it be clear to everyone Cambiemos, next time I'll break [ties]."

On March 1, 2020, she resigned as a national deputy.

Personal life
Carrió always appears in public wearing a crucifix, claims to take communion every day and once told Raúl Alfonsín she had seen the Virgin Mary. She is against decriminalization of drug use and abortion. She refrained from legalizing gay marriage and was neutral about it.

Publications 
 Vida (Life), 2019
 Yo amo la República (I love the Republic), 2015
 Humanismo y Libertad Tomo II (Humanism and Liberty Volume II), 2014
 Humanismo y Libertad Tomo I (Humanism and Liberty Volume I), 2013
 El futuro es hoy (The future is today), 2011
 La educación como política central del porvenir (Education as the central policy for the future), 2006
 La nueva matriz de saqueo (The new matrix of looting), 2006
 Búsquedas de sentido para una nueva política (Search for meaning for a new policy), 2005
 La concepción del poder desde las mujeres (The conception of women's power), 2005
 Hacia un nuevo contrato moral: discursos e intervenciones sobre la realidad nacional (Towards a new moral contract: discourse and interventions in national reality), 2004

See also
 List of political parties in Argentina
 Politics of Argentina

References

External links

 (in Spanish)

1956 births
Living people
People from Resistencia, Chaco
National University of the Northeast alumni
Members of the Argentine Chamber of Deputies elected in Buenos Aires
Members of the Argentine Chamber of Deputies elected in Chaco
Radical Civic Union politicians
Civic Coalition ARI politicians
Candidates for President of Argentina
Argentine Roman Catholics
Women members of the Argentine Chamber of Deputies
20th-century Argentine politicians
20th-century Argentine women politicians
21st-century Argentine politicians
21st-century Argentine women politicians